Shizilu is a railway station on the Alishan Forest Railway line located in Alishan Township, Chiayi County, Taiwan.

History
The station was opened on 1 October 1912.

See also
 List of railway stations in Taiwan

References

1912 establishments in Taiwan
Alishan Forest Railway stations
Railway stations in Chiayi County
Railway stations opened in 1912